Petrică Buricea (born 1 March 1955) is a Romanian fencer. He competed in the team foil event at the 1976 Summer Olympics.

References

1955 births
Living people
Romanian male fencers
Romanian foil fencers
Olympic fencers of Romania
Fencers at the 1976 Summer Olympics